Plucknett may refer to:

 Haselbury Plucknett, a village in Somerset, England
 Preston Plucknett, a former village in Somerset, England

People
 Ben Plucknett (1954–2002), U.S. athlete
 Victoria Plucknett, Welsh actress

See also
 Collier and Plucknett, an England Victorian-era furniture maker